The 2015 Hull City Council election took place on 7 May 2015 to elect members of Hull City Council in England. This was on the same day as other local elections.

One third of the council was up for election and Labour retained control of the council.

After the election, the composition of the council was

Labour 40
Liberal Democrat 15
Conservative 2
Hull Red Labour 1
UK Independence 1

Ward results

No elections were held in Bricknell, St Andrews, Southcoates East and Southcoates West wards.

References

2015 English local elections
May 2015 events in the United Kingdom
2015
2010s in Kingston upon Hull